KBXS may refer to:

 KTSH-CD, a Telemundo affiliate (channel 20) licensed to serve Shreveport, Louisiana, United States, which held the call signs KBXS-CA/CD from 2001 to 2022
 KDSS, a radio station (92.7 FM) licensed to serve Ely, Nevada, United States, which held the call sign KBXS from 1983 to 1992